

September 2008 Peshawar bombing

The September 2008 Peshawar bombing was a bombing that occurred on 6 September 2008, in the outskirts of Peshawar, North West Frontier Province, Pakistan. A suicide bomber blew up at a police checkpoint, killing 35 and injuring 70. The explosives-packed pick-up truck blasted a crater  crater and caused some buildings in a nearby market to collapse, leading to frantic rescue efforts.

December 2008 Peshawar bombing

The December 2008 Peshawar bombing was a bombing that occurred on 5 December 2008 in the Pakistani city of Peshawar, killing 29 people and injuring over 100 others. Local police chief Naveed Khan suggested that chemicals intended to increase the spread of fire were contained in the bomb.

The attack destroyed a hotel and a mosque, and set fire to several shops.

Background
The incidents took place while people were shopping for the Eid al-Adha festival, which starts on 9 December 2008, and it took place on the same day as another attack in the country, which killed six people. This attack took place in the area south of Peshawar.

During the weeks before the attack Sunni Muslim groups of militants launched attacks on the minority Shi'ite population, with this attack being located near a community centre for Shi'ites.

Reaction
Asif Ali Zardari, the President of Pakistan, strongly condemned the attacks, and said that the perpetrators of the attacks will be found and brought to justice, and expressed his condolences to the families of the dead.

He also stated, in response to the attacks, that his country was committed to fighting terrorism. The Pakistani military strengthened its operations against the Taliban and al-Qaida, who are blamed for the attacks.

See also
List of terrorist incidents, 2008
Violence in Pakistan 2006-09

References

2008 murders in Pakistan
21st-century mass murder in Pakistan
Car and truck bombings in Pakistan
Bombing, 2008
Mass murder in 2008
Terrorist incidents in Pakistan in 2008
Building bombings in Pakistan